The Ducati Mach 1 was a 250 cc single-cylinder engine motorcycle, the fastest 250 road bikes at the time.  It was capable of just over 100 mph (160 km/h) in full road going trim (lights and silencer). 
Many were converted for racing use, and in the hands of Mike Rogers it gave Ducati a TT win when he won the 250 cc production TT. 
The regulations for the production TT were strict, and Mike Rogers averaged 134.84 km/h on his almost production condition Mach 1 with a fairing and painted green. Mike Rogers was blind in his left eye as a result of a childhood accident, but his efforts and the consistent performance of his Mach 1 enabled him to win. Nowadays, Ducati Mach 1 is one of the most sought after machines among enthusiasts of older bikes. The engine number was DM250M1 00001-01950 and the DM250M1 engine was also used in some Ducati Mark 3s. A total of 838 Ducati Mach 1s were produced, but not many are still in existence as they were also used for racing.

References

External links

 Mach 1 at Ducati.com Heritage (archived)

Mach 1
Standard motorcycles
Motorcycles introduced in 1965
Single-cylinder motorcycles